Richard L. Billinger (born December 16, 1951) is an American politician serving as a member of the Kansas Senate for the 40th district

Career 
Billinger represented the 121st district of the Kansas House of Representatives, was redistricted and ran for the 120th in 2012 and lost his primary to Ward Cassidy, then won the 120th in 2014.

Billinger succeeded Ralph Ostmeyer in the Kansas Senate in 2017. The senate district covers the entirety of Cheyenne, Decatur, Ellis, Gove, Graham, Logan, Norton, Rawlins, Sheridan, Sherman, Thomas, Trego, and Wallace Counties and also part of Phillips County.

References

Republican Party Kansas state senators
Living people
21st-century American politicians
1951 births
People from Quinter, Kansas
People from Goodland, Kansas
Fort Hays State University alumni